Going Vertical, also known as Three Seconds is a 2017 Russian sports drama film directed by Anton Megerdichev about the controversial victory of the Soviet national basketball team over the 1972 U.S. Olympic team, ending their 63-game winning streak, at the Munich Summer Olympic's men's basketball tournament.

Upon its release on December 28, 2017, Going Vertical achieved critical and commercial success.

Plot
The year was 1970. The senior men's Soviet Union national basketball team had changed its head coach. The team's new head coach, Vladimir Garanzhin (Vladimir Kondrashin), who was also the head coach of the Leningrad based BC Spartak basketball club, of the USSR Premier League; said at a press conference that at the Munich Summer Olympic Games, the Soviet Union was going to beat the U.S. men's national basketball team. The statements of the coach frightened Soviet sports officials, for whom their main goal was to perform strongly at the world's biggest sporting stage, in the year of the 50th anniversary of the Soviet Union, and keep their posts.

Vladimir Garanzhin completely changed the composition of the Soviet team, and it was no longer dominated by CSKA Moscow players, but instead the players from several different clubs of the country. Garanzhin also began training the team with new coaching techniques; he needed to inspire the team, and convince the players that they could beat the American team.

It was the night of 9 to 10 September 1972. The city of Munich, which had survived a terrorist attack three days earlier, had continued to host sports competitions at the Summer Olympic Games. The long-awaited finale of the XX Olympic Summer Basketball Tournament had finally arrived. The two final teams, as had been predicted by Garanzhin, were the USSR and U.S. teams. Up to the decisive game, both teams were unbeaten. And the outcome of the dramatic final match was decided in the last three seconds of the game...

Cast

Production
Even before the release of the film, it aroused sharp criticism from Yevgenia Kondrashina and Alexandra Ovchinnikova (widows of Vladimir Kondrashin and Alexander Belov), and Yuri Kondrashin (son of Vladimir Petrovich). In their opinion, the authors of the film plunged into their private lives, and included information about it in the script without their consent.

Filming
Principal photography began in August 2016, in Moscow.

The last scenes of the film - the scenes of the final match of the 1972 Olympic Games basketball tournament, between the USSR and the US national teams - were filmed in the first filming days. Instead of filming a crowd of fans, advertising, and other attributes of the Munich match, the shooting technique used the "chromakey" technology.

Reception
The film received mostly positive reviews in the Russian press. Enthusiastic reviews were published by Arguments and Facts, Gazeta.ru, KG-Portal, moderately positive reviews by Novaya Gazeta, Komsomolskaya Pravda, Meduza, Esquire, Film.ru, Rossiyskaya Gazeta, Trud and Poster. Anton Dolin, in his review, noted that Going Vertical" is "a truly sports film that takes teamwork and coherence more than someone's individual talent or charisma".Движение вверх (2017) отзывы о фильме  — Мегакритик«Газета.Ru» о фильме «Движение вверх»  — Газета.Ru, КГ-Портал

Box office
According to the United Federal Automated Information System on Movie Screenings in Cinema Halls (UAIS), the gross of the film, as of 2018, amounted to more than ₽2.9billion, making the picture the higgest-grossing film in the history of modern Russian film distribution (post-Soviet era).‘Three Seconds’: Olympic Basketball Drama Is Russia’s Highest-Grossing Movie Ever

It also became the highest-grossing Russian film in China, where it grossed .

See also
 Legend No. 17''

References

External links 
 
 

2017 films
2010s Russian-language films
2010s English-language films
2010s sports drama films
2017 biographical drama films
Russian sports drama films
Basketball films
Sports films based on actual events
Drama films based on actual events
Russian biographical drama films
Biographical films about sportspeople
Films set in 1972
Films about the 1972 Summer Olympics
Final
Films set in 1971
Cultural depictions of basketball players
Cultural depictions of Russian people
Films produced by Nikita Mikhalkov
2017 multilingual films
Russian multilingual films